The New Adventures of Jonny Quest is an American animated series produced by Hanna-Barbera Productions, and a continuation of the 1964–65 television series Jonny Quest. Debuting in 1986 as part of The Funtastic World of Hanna-Barbera syndication package (it was the seventh and final Hanna-Barbera cartoon of the four and a half weekday/weekend morning line-up), this new series could be seen as the second season to a program that originally aired from 1964 to 1965 on ABC.

Plot
This series features Dr. Quest and his group as they go on new adventures while thwarting different bad guys like the mad scientist Dr. Zin. Some episodes had them gaining a stone man named Hardrock as their ally.

Voice cast

Main
 Scott Menville as Jonny Quest
 Don Messick as Dr. Benton Quest, Bandit
 Rob Paulsen as Hadji
 Vic Perrin as Dr. Zin (3 episodes)
 Jeffrey Tambor as Hardrock (7 episodes)
 Granville Van Dusen as Race Bannon

Additional cast
 René Auberjonois as Mr. Peters in "Vikong Lives"
 Michael Bell as Dr. Phorbus in "Peril of the Reptilian"
 Candy Brown
 Howard Caine
 Roger C. Carmel
 Peter Cullen as Patch in "Peril of the Reptilian"
 Jennifer Darling
 Barry Dennen
 Richard Erdman
 Bernard Erhard
 Dick Gautier
  Ernest Harada
 Dorian Harewood
 Darryl Hickman
  Georgi Irene as Jessie Bradshaw in "Deadly Junket"
 Aron Kincaid
 Ruth Kobart
 Keye Luke
 Allan Lurie
  Scott McGowan
 Soon-Tek Oh
 Andre Stojka as Simon in "Peril of the Reptilian"
 George Takei as Chin in "Secret of the Clay Warriors"
 Les Tremayne as Sheik Abu Saddi in "Nightmare in Steel"
 B.J. Ward as CAP in "The Scourge of Skyborg"
 Frank Welker as Baksheesh in "Nightmare in Steel", Vikong in "Vikong Lives", Remy in "Vikong Lives"
  Stan Wojno
 Keone Young as Fake Elder in "Secret of the Clay Warriors"

Production and history

In the late 1970s, Hanna-Barbera produced concept art for a new series entitled Young Dr. Quest: The Adventures of Jon Quest, featuring an older Jonny, Hadji, and an adopted Japanese girl. They would be accompanied by pets Bandit II and Oboe (an unspecified species of monkey), and receive support from Benton Quest and Race Bannon at times (with Race having since married Jade). According to Disney historian Jim Korkis, Doug Wildey later pitched the concept as simply named Young Dr. Quest to Joseph Barbera, featuring Jonny as a 22-year old MIT graduate going on adventure with Race and Hadji.

By the mid-1980s, the edited episodes of the original Jonny Quest series (each episode was missing about five minutes of footage edited for time constraints and content) were part of The Funtastic World'''s second season lineup, alongside Yogi's Treasure Hunt, Paw Paws and Galtar and the Golden Lance. Thirteen episodes were produced in 1986 to accompany the original in the Funtastic World programming block. These episodes were referred to simply as Jonny Quest on their title cards, and were noticeably less violent and more “kid-friendly” than the 1960s version.

This was followed by two television films, Jonny's Golden Quest in 1993 and Jonny Quest vs. The Cyber Insects in 1995, with Don Messick, Granville Van Dusen and Rob Paulsen voicing Dr. Quest, Race and Hadji. The 1980s Quest series introduced a new character named Hardrock, an ancient man made of stone. He did not return in any later versions of the program.

Episodes

Home media
On April 8, 2014, Warner Archive released Jonny Quest: The Complete Eighties Adventures'' on DVD in region 1 as part of their Hanna-Barbera Classics Collection. This is a Manufacture-on-Demand (MOD) release, available exclusively through Warner's online store and Amazon.com.

References

External links
 
 JQStyle, A different kind of Jonny Quest fan site.

Jonny Quest
1986 American television series debuts
1987 American television series endings
1980s American animated television series
1980s American comic science fiction television series
American animated television spin-offs
American children's animated action television series
American children's animated adventure television series
American children's animated comic science fiction television series
American children's animated science fantasy television series
English-language television shows
Television series by Hanna-Barbera
The Funtastic World of Hanna-Barbera
Animated television series about children
Animated television series about orphans